Kannenaikankoppa is a village in Dharwad district of Karnataka, India.

Demographics 
As of the 2011 Census of India there were 60 households in Kannenaikankoppa and a total population of 361 consisting of 203 males and 158 females. There were 60 children ages 0-6.

References

Villages in Dharwad district